Megacraspedus lanceolellus is a moth of the family Gelechiidae. It was described by Philipp Christoph Zeller in 1850. It is found in Spain, France, Germany, Austria, Italy and Ukraine, as well as on Sicily.

References

Moths described in 1850
Megacraspedus